The 1973 Auburn Tigers football team achieved an overall record of 6–6 and 2–5 in the SEC under head coach Ralph "Shug" Jordan.  They were invited to the 1973 Sun Bowl where they lost to Missouri 17–34.

On September 13, 1973, the Thursday before Auburn's first home game of the season, Auburn's home stadium, known up to that time as Cliff Hare Stadium, was renamed in honor of the Ralph Jordan, marking the first time a stadium has been renamed for an active coach.  Harry Philpott, President of Auburn University at that time, said "Renaming the stadium is really in keeping with the outstanding job Coach Jordan has done during his outstanding career", adding that, "It also brings together two great eras of athletic achievement."

Four players were named to the All-SEC first team for 1973: Benny Sivley (DT), Steve Taylor (C), Mike Fuller (DB), and David Langner (DB).

On December 1, Alabama avenged their stunning loss the previous year in the Iron Bowl game that became known as "Punt Bama Punt" by shutting out Auburn 35–0.

Schedule

Roster

References

Auburn
Auburn Tigers football seasons
Auburn Tigers football